The following is a list of the monastic houses in Lancashire, England.

See also
 List of monastic houses in England

Notes

References

Bibliography

History of Lancashire
England in the High Middle Ages
Medieval sites in England
Lists of buildings and structures in Lancashire
Archaeological sites in Lancashire
Houses in Lancashire
 
Lancashire
Lancashire